Schwalm-Eder is an electoral constituency (German: Wahlkreis) represented in the Bundestag. It elects one member via first-past-the-post voting. Under the current constituency numbering system, it is designated as constituency 170. It is located in northern Hesse, comprising the Schwalm-Eder-Kreis district and the southern part of the Waldeck-Frankenberg district.

Schwalm-Eder was created for the inaugural 1949 federal election. Since 2009, it has been represented by Edgar Franke of the Social Democratic Party (SPD).

Geography
Schwalm-Eder is located in northern Hesse. As of the 2021 federal election, it comprises the entirety of the Schwalm-Eder-Kreis district and the municipalities of Allendorf (Eder), Battenberg (Eder), Bromskirchen, Burgwald, Frankenau, Frankenberg, Gemünden (Wohra), Haina, Hatzfeld, Rosenthal, and Vöhl from the Waldeck-Frankenberg district.

History
Schwalm-Eder was created in 1949, then known as Fritzlar-Homberg. In the 1976 election, it was named Fritzlar. It acquired its current name in the 1980 election. In the 1949 election, it was Hesse constituency 4 in the numbering system. In the 1953 through 1976 elections, it was number 129. From 1980 through 1998, it was number 127. In 2002 and 2005, it was number 172. In the 2009 election, it was number 171. Since 2013, it has been number 170.

Originally, the constituency comprised the districts of Frankenberg, Fritzlar-Homberg, and Ziegenhain. In the 1965 and 1969 elections, it also contained the municipality of Schiffelbach from the Landkreis Marburg district. In the 1972 election, it comprised the districts of Frankenberg and Fritzlar-Homberg, the municipality of Breitenbach am Herzberg from the Hersfeld-Rotenburg district, the municipality of Schiffelbach from the Landkreis Marburg district, and the Ortsteile of Berfa, Hattendorf, and Lingelbach in Alsfeld municipality from the Vogelsbergkreis district. In the 1976 election, it acquired borders similar to its current configuration, but excluding the municipalities of Felsberg, Guxhagen, Körle, Malsfeld, Melsungen, Morschen, and Spangenberg from Schwalm-Eder-Kreis. It acquired its current borders in the 2002 election.

Members
The constituency has been held by the Social Democratic Party (SPD) during all but three Bundestag terms since its creation. It was first represented by August-Martin Euler of the Free Democratic Party (FDP) from 1949 to 1957, followed by Kurt Wittmer-Eigenbrodt of the Christian Democratic Union (CDU) until 1961. Harri Bading of the SPD was elected in 1961 and served two terms. He was succeeded by Heinz Kreutzmann, who served from 1969 to 1983. Albert Pfuhl was then representative from 1983 to 1994, followed by Gerd Höfer until 2009. Edgar Franke was elected in 2009, and re-elected in 2013, 2017, and 2021.

Election results

2021 election

2017 election

2013 election

2009 election

Notes

References

Federal electoral districts in Hesse
1949 establishments in West Germany
Constituencies established in 1949
Schwalm-Eder-Kreis
Waldeck-Frankenberg